Ü (lowercase ü) is a Latin script character composed of the letter U and the diaeresis diacritical mark. In some alphabets such as those of a number of Romance languages or Guarani it denotes an instance of regular U to be construed in isolation from adjacent characters with which it would usually form a larger unit; other alphabets like the Azerbaijani, Estonian, German, Hungarian and Turkish ones treat it as a letter in its own right. In those cases it typically represents a close front rounded vowel .

Although not a part of their alphabet, Ü also appears in languages such as Finnish and Swedish when retained in foreign proper names like München ("Munich"). A small number of Dutch and Afrikaans words employ the character to mark vowel hiatus (e.g. reünie /reːyˈni/ ("reunion"), a loanword marked with diaeresis to suppress the native reading of eu as a digraph pronounced /øː/).

U-umlaut 
A glyph, U with umlaut, appears in the German alphabet. It represents the umlauted form of u, which results in  when long and  when short. The letter is collated together with U, or as UE. In languages that have adopted German names or spellings, such as Swedish, the letter also occurs. It is however not a part of these languages' alphabets. In Swedish the letter is called tyskt y which means German y.

In other languages that do not have the letter as part of the regular alphabet or in limited character sets such as ASCII, U-umlaut is frequently replaced with the two-letter combination "ue". Software for optical character recognition sometimes sees it falsely as ii.

Letter Ü 

The letter Ü is present in the Hungarian, Turkish, Uyghur Latin, Estonian, Azeri, Turkmen, Crimean Tatar, Kazakh Latin and Tatar Latin alphabets, where it represents a close front rounded vowel . It is considered a distinct letter, collated separately, not a simple modification of U or Y, and is distinct from UE.

In the Swedish and Finnish alphabets ü is alphabetized as y.

This same letter appears in the Chinese Romanisations pinyin, Wade–Giles, and the German-based Lessing-Othmer, where it represents the same sound : 綠/lǜ (green) or 女/nǚ (female). Pinyin only uses "Ü" to represent  after the letters "L" or "N" to avoid confusion with words such as 路/lù (road) and 怒/nù (anger). As the letter "Ü" is missing on most keyboards and the letter "V" is not present in standard Mandarin pinyin, the letter "V" is used on most computer Chinese input methods to enter the letter "Ü". As a result, romanisation of Chinese with the letter "V" representing the Ü sound is sometimes found. However, Ü sound should be officially represented by "yu" in Pinyin when it is difficult to enter Ü. For example, the surname Lü (吕) would be written as "Lyu" in passports. Four extra tones for the letter "ü", which are "ǖ, ǘ, ǚ, ǜ", is added in Unicode as per GB/T 2312.

U-diaeresis 

Several languages use diaeresis over the letter U to show that the letter is pronounced in its regular way, without dropping out or building diphthongs with neighboring letters.

In Spanish, it is used to distinguish between "gue"/"güe" / and "gui"/"güi" /: nicaragüense ("Nicaraguan"), pingüino ("penguin").

Similarly in Catalan, "gue~güe" are ~, "gui~güi" are ~, "que~qüe" are ~ and "qui~qüi" are ~, 
as in aigües, pingüins, qüestió, adeqüi. Also, ü is used to mark that vowel pairs that normally would form a diphthong must be pronounced as separate syllables, examples: Raül, diürn.

In French, the diaeresis appears over the "u" only very rarely, in some uncommon words, capharnaüm  ('shambles'), Capharnaüm/Capernaüm  or Emmaüs . After the 1990 spelling reforms, it is applied to a few more words, like  aigüe (formerly aiguë), ambigüe (formerly ambiguë) and argüer  (formerly without the diaeresis).

Usage in phonetic alphabets 

Typography 
Historically the unique letter Ü and U-diaeresis were written as a U with two dots above the letter. 

U-umlaut was written as a U with a small e written above (Uͤ uͤ): this minute e degenerated to two vertical bars in medieval handwritings. In most later handwritings these bars in turn nearly became dots.

In modern typography there was insufficient space on typewriters and later computer keyboards to allow for both a U-with-dots (also representing Ü) and a U-with-bars. Since they looked near-identical the two glyphs were combined, which was also done in computer character encodings such as ISO 8859-1. As a result, there was no way to differentiate between the three different characters. While the distinction can be recreated in modern Unicode using combining diacritics, modern typographic standards do not recommend doing so. In the Hungarian alphabet, double acute U (Ű) is a distinct letter representing a long Ü.

Computing codes

Tonal marks for Hanyu Pinyin

Keyboarding
 Microsoft Windows – some keyboard layouts feature separate keys for 
 Using the Swiss French keyboard,  can be entered by typing 
 Using the US International layout,  can be entered by typing 
 In GTK-based GUI-Applications,  followed by the Hex-Code

See also
 Umlaut (diacritic)
Ӱ ӱ : Cyrillic letter U with diaeresis
Ү ү : Cyrillic letter Ue

References

Latin letters with diacritics
Vowel letters